Casco is a town in Cumberland County, Maine, United States. The population was 3,646 at the 2020 census. Casco includes the villages of Casco, South Casco and Cook Mills. The town borders the east shore of Sebago Lake, and is home to part of Sebago Lake State Park. Casco is part of the Portland–South Portland–Biddeford, Maine metropolitan statistical area. Casco is just under  from downtown Portland.

Casco is the home of "Casco Days", an annual community fair which takes place in Casco Days Park, always on the last Saturday in July.

History

On January 30, 1767, Raymondtown Plantation was granted by the Massachusetts General Court to Capt. William Raymond of Beverly, Massachusetts and his company of soldiers for their service with Sir William Phipps in the 1690 Battle of Quebec. It replaced a 1735 grant called Beverly-Canada (now Weare, New Hampshire) which was ruled invalid in 1741 because of a prior claim by the heirs of John Mason. In 1803, Raymondtown Plantation was incorporated as Raymond. The town of Naples was created with land taken in 1838, the same year the western half of Raymond petitioned the legislature to be set off as a township because of its geographical separation behind Rattlesnake Mountain. The petition failed, but three years later another was accepted. On March 18, 1841, Casco was incorporated as a town.

Farmers found the surface of the town uneven, its hard and rocky soil "tolerably productive." Outlets of ponds, however, provided Casco with good sites for water powered mills. The town had four sawmills, four gristmills, a shook mill, a barrel stave mill, four shingle factories, a carriage factory and a tannery. In 1832, the Cumberland and Oxford Canal made Sebago Lake a direct trade route to Portland. Steamboat travel commenced on the waterways in the 1840s, carrying tourists and freight.
In 1938, Sebago Lake State Park was established, one of the state's five original state parks.

Geography

Casco is drained by the Crooked River and Songo River.

The town is crossed by U.S. Route 302 and state routes 11, 85 and 121. It is bordered by the town of Raymond to the southeast, Naples and Otisfield to the northwest, and Poland to the northeast. The village of Casco, a census-designated place, is located along Route 121 near the northern corner of town. South Casco is located along US 302 between Sebago Lake and Thomas Pond in the southeast corner of the town, and Cook Mills is located along Route 11 near the western border of the town.

Demographics

2010 census

As of the census of 2010, there were 3,742 people, 1,554 households, and 1,041 families living in the town. The racial makeup of the town was 97.0% White, 0.7% African American, 0.3% Native American, 0.3% Asian, 0.2% from other races, and 1.5% from two or more races. Hispanic or Latino of any race were 1.2% of the population.

There were 1,554 households, of which 29.7% had children under the age of 18 living with them, 51.4% were married couples living together, 10.6% had a female householder with no husband present, 5.0% had a male householder with no wife present, and 33.0% were non-families. 25.0% of all households were made up of individuals, and 11.5% had someone living alone who was 65 years of age or older. The average household size was 2.41 and the average family size was 2.82.

The median age in the town was 42.6 years. 21.5% of residents were under the age of 18; 6.3% were between the ages of 18 and 24; 25.9% were from 25 to 44; 31.8% were from 45 to 64; and 14.7% were 65 years of age or older. The gender makeup of the town was 49.4% male and 50.6% female.

2000 census

As of the census of 2000, there were 3,469 people, 1,327 households, and 958 families living in the town. The racial makeup of the town was 97.95% White, 0.29% African American, 0.37% Native American, 0.52% Asian, 0.12% from other races, and 0.75% from two or more races. Hispanic or Latino of any race were 0.52% of the population.

There were 1,327 households, out of which 34.1% had children under the age of 18 living with them, 58.3% were married couples living together, 10.4% had a female householder with no husband present, and 27.8% were non-families. 20.4% of all households were made up of individuals, and 6.8% had someone living alone who was 65 years of age or older.  The average household size was 2.58 and the average family size was 2.96.

In the town, the population was spread out, with 25.2% under the age of 18, 6.5% from 18 to 24, 32.1% from 25 to 44, 24.7% from 45 to 64, and 11.4% who were 65 years of age or older.  The median age was 38 years. For every 100 females, there were 97.7 males.  For every 100 females age 18 and over, there were 94.3 males.

The median income for a household in the town was $41,629, and the median income for a family was $49,500. Males had a median income of $31,679 versus $25,306 for females. The per capita income for the town was $19,306.  About 5.3% of families and 8.1% of the population were below the poverty line, including 8.5% of those under age 18 and 9.8% of those age 65 or over.

Transportation

Casco is home to several important roads, both locally and nationally. 
 Maine State Route 11: The longest state highway in Maine, Route 11 has been the long-time throughway for trucks, particularly lumber trucks. Route 11 is known locally as Poland Springs Road.
 Maine State Route 35: Route 35 parallels Route 302 for its entirety of the Casco region. Upon arriving in Naples, 35 runs north along Long Lake towards Harrison.
 Maine State Route 85: Known locally as Webbs Mills Road, Route 85 is just under . It connects Route 302 and Route 11. The route begins on the Northeast corner of Sebago Lake, runs through the town of Raymond, and then terminates at Route 11.
 Maine State Route 121: Known locally as Meadow Road, Route 121 begins at Route 302 on the northeast corner of Sebago Lake. It intersects Route 11 just south of downtown Casco, and then continues into downtown Casco.
 US Route 302: Known locally as Roosevelt Trail, Route 302 is the main street of the lakes region. It provides a direct thruway to Portland, and many other large towns in Maine.

Sites of interest

 Raymond-Casco Historical Society, Museum at Watkins Farm on Route 302 in Casco
 Nathaniel Hawthorne's boyhood home in Raymond
 Sebago Lake State Park
 Netop Summer Camp
 Seeds of Peace international camp
 Camp Laurel South, the most expensive four-week summer camp in the United States
 Camp Cedar
Point Sebago Resort

Notable people 

 Luther Gulick, physician, member of Basketball Hall of Fame
 William LeMessurier, structural engineer
 Bonnie Titcomb Lewis, state legislator
 Tony Montanaro, mime artist
 Susan Augusta Pike Sanders, teacher, clubwoman, author

References

External links
 Town of Casco official website
 Casco Public Library

 
Towns in Cumberland County, Maine
Portland metropolitan area, Maine
Towns in Maine